Vitor Hugo Oliveira Corrêa da Silva (born 17 April 2002), commonly known as Dedé, is a Brazilian footballer who currently plays for Botafogo.

Career statistics

Club

Notes

References

External links

2002 births
Living people
Brazilian footballers
Association football forwards
Boavista Sport Club players
Botafogo de Futebol e Regatas players